The 423d Bombardment Squadron is an inactive United States Air Force unit.  Its last assignment was with the 306th Bombardment Wing at MacDill Air Force Base, Florida.

The squadron was first activated as the 34th Reconnaissance Squadron in the spring of 1942, but was soon renamed the 423d Bombardment Squadron, one of the original four bombardment squadrons assigned to the 306th Bombardment Group.  After training with Boeing B-17 Flying Fortresses, the squadron moved overseas and participated in combat in the European theater, earning two Distinguished Unit Citations for its efforts.  After the war the 423d remained in Europe with the occupation forces until inactivating in 1946.

The squadron was activated again at Langley AFB, Virginia and served as a combat crew training squadron for aircrews flying the Douglas B-26 Invader.  It was inactivated in 1954 as the B-26 was being withdrawn from active service and the need for crew training on the aircraft decreased.

The third active period for the unit began in 1958 when Strategic Air Command (SAC) expanded its Boeing B-47 Stratojet wings from three to four squadrons.  It flew the Stratojet until 1962 when SAC drew down its medium bomber force in favor of the Boeing B-52 Stratofortress.

History

World War II
The squadron was first established as the 34th Reconnaissance Squadron, a B-17 Flying Fortress heavy bomber unit in early 1942.   Shortly after activation, the squadron was redesignated as the 423d Bombardment Squadron.  It trained under Second Air Force before deploying for England in September 1942, becoming one of the first heavy bombardment squadrons of the VIII Bomber Command's 1st Bombardment Division.

The squadron operated primarily against strategic targets, including the locomotive factory at Lille, France, rail yards at Rouen, France, and Stuttgart Germany.  The squadron took part in the first strike into Germany by bombers of Eighth Air Force on 27 January 1943 when it struck U-boat yards at Wilhelmshaven.  It struck shipbuilding yards at Vegesack, ball bearing plants at Schweinfurt, the  aircraft factory at Leipzig, Germany, and similar facilities.

On 1 May 1943 the aircraft in which Staff Sergeant Maynard Smith was a gunner was struck by enemy fire, igniting fires in the plane's radio compartment and waist.  Sgt Smith threw exploding ammunition overboard, extinguished the fire, administered first aid to the wounded tail gunner and manned his gun until enemy fighter aircraft were driven off.  Sgt Smith was awarded the Medal of Honor for his actions on this mission.

On 11 January 1944 the squadron and its parent group completed an attack on aircraft factories in central Germany without fighter escort and in the face of strong opposing forces.  For this mission, the squadron was awarded the Distinguished Unit Citation (DUC).  The following month the squadron earned a second DUC for its performance during Big Week, an intensive bombing campaign against the German aircraft industry.  Despite adverse weather on 22 February that led supporting elements to abandon the mission the squadron and group effectively bombed the aircraft assembly plant at Bernberg, Germany.

The squadron also performed in a tactical role, assisting ground forces in the St Lo breakthrough, the airborne invasion of the Netherlands, stopping German attacking forces in the Battle of the Bulge, and bombing enemy positions during the airborne assault across the Rhine river in the spring of 1945.

After the German surrender the 423d and other elements of the 40th Bombardment Wing participated in the Green Project using B-17s as transports along ATC routes from Western Europe, Italy and the United Kingdom to North Africa to return servicement to the United States.  The squadron became part of the occupation forces in late 1945 and participated in Project Casey Jones, the photographic mapping of portions of Europe and North Africa.  When the squadron's parent group began to phase out of the project in July the squadron was attached to the 305th Bombardment Group.  Toward the end of 1946 responsibility for the unfinished portion of the project was transferred to XII Tactical Air Command and the squadron was inactivated at the end of 1946.

Note:  Oregon Chapter – Eighth Air Force Historical Society B-17 Squadrons 367, 368, 369, & 423 lists crew photos taken during World War II.

Cold War
During and immediately after the Korean War, Tactical Air Command (TAC) trained aircrews for the Douglas B-26 Invader at Langley AFB, Virginia.  The three squadrons of the 4400th Combat Crew Training Group performing this mission were Air National Guard units that had been called up for the war.  At the start of 1953, these squadrons were released to state control and the 423d Bombardment Squadron was activated and took over the mission, personnel, and equipment of the 117th Bombardment Squadron, which returned to the Pennsylvania guard.  In January 1954, the group mission shifted to tactical bombardment and it was redesignated the 4400th Bombardment Group.   As the group began to anticipate the transition to Martin B-57 Canberra aircraft, TAC decided to replace the Table of Distribution 4400th group and its squadrons with the regular 345th Bombardment Group, which took over their mission in July 1954 as the 423d was inactivated.

The squadron was activated for a third time in 1959 as Strategic Air Command (SAC)'s Boeing B-47 Stratojet fleet reached a peak of twenty-seven wings and SAC added a fourth squadron to each wing.  However, newer and more capable Boeing B-52 Stratofortresses and the number of Strategic Wings equipped with dispersed B-52s more than doubled between 1959 and 1960.  In March 1961, President John F. Kennedy directed that the phaseout of the B-47 be accelerated. As a result, the squadron was inactivated on 1 January 1962, and its aircraft were sent to storage with the 2704th AF Aircraft Storage and Disposition Group at Davis-Monthan Air Force Base, Arizona.

Lineage
 Constituted as the 34th Reconnaissance Squadron (Heavy) on 28 January 1942
 Activated on 1 March 1942
 Redesignated 423d Bombardment Squadron (Heavy) on 22 April 1942
 Redesignated 423d Bombardment Squadron, Heavy on 20 August 1943
 Inactivated on 25 December 1946
 Redesignated 423d Bombardment Squadron, Light on 15 November 1952
 Activated on 1 January 1953
 Inactivated on 19 July 1954
 Redesignated 423d Bombardment Squadron, Medium on 6 October 1958
 Activated on 1 January 1959
 Discontinued and inactivated on 1 January 1962

Assignments
 306th Bombardment Group: 1 March 1942 – 25 December 1946 (attached to 305th Bombardment Group after 16 July 1946)
 4430th Air Base Wing: 1 January 1953 (attached to 4400th Combat Crew Training Group)
 4400th Combat Crew Training Group (later 4400th Bombardment Group, Tactical (Training)): 1 May 1953 – 19 July 1954
 306th Bombardment Wing: 1 January 1959 – 1 January 1962

Stations

 Gowen Field, Idaho, 1 March 1942
 Wendover Field, Utah, c. 6 April – 1 August 1942
 RAF Thurleigh (Station 111), England, c. 9 September 1942
 Detachment operated from Istres-Le Tubé Air Base (Y-17), France, 31 August – December 1945
 AAF Station Giebelstadt (Y-90), Germany, 17 December 1945

 Istres-Le Tubé Air Base (Y-17), France, 26 February 1946
 Detachment operated from: Mallard Field, French West Africa, March – May 1946
 Detachment operated from: Gibraltar, June – 26 September 1946
 AAF Station Lechfeld (R-71), Germany, 16 July – 25 December 1946
 Detachment operated from: Port Lyautey Airfield, French Morocco, 16 July – 26 September 1946
 Langley Air Force Base, Virginia, 1 January 1953 – 19 July 1954
 MacDill Air Force Base, Florida, 1 January 1959 – 1 January 1962

Aircraft
 Boeing B-17 Flying Fortress, 1942–1946
 Douglas B-26 Invader, 1953–1954
 Boeing B-47 Stratojet, 1959–1961

Awards and Campaigns

See also

List of B-47 units of the United States Air Force

References

Notes
 Explanatory notes

 Citations

Bibliography

External links
 Oregon Chapter – Eighth Air Force Historical Society

Military units and formations established in 1942
Bombardment squadrons of the United States Army Air Forces
Bombardment squadrons of the United States Air Force